Phuan may refer to:

Phuan language
Phuan people